Panitsovo is a village in  South-East Bulgaria, situated in Obshtina Nessebar, in the Burgas region.

Villages in Burgas Province